The Zala Predators or ZP for short, are an American Football team based in the west of Hungary in the provincial town of Zalaegerszeg. They play in MAFL Veritas Division II and are a member of the nearly 20-team-strong Hungarian American Football League. Founded in 2004, the club played their first game against Nagykanizsa Demons in August 2005.

Since then, the club has grown and boasts a growing Booster Club, a development Junior team and a Cheerleading team. 

ZP play in the West Division II group. The ZP defense are called 'A Kutya' which is Hungarian for 'The Dogs'.  The ZP offense are called 'Pancélos' which is Hungarian for 'Armour'.

Game history

American football teams in Hungary
Sports teams in Hungary
Defunct American football teams in Europe
Sport in Zalaegerszeg